Shirley Adams is a 2009 film directed and written by South African filmmaker Oliver Hermanus.

Synopsis
In a Cape Town slum, Shirley Adams spends her days taking care of her disabled son Donovan, caught by a stray bullet in crossfire between two gangs. Having been left by her husband, the woman can barely make ends meet after seeing all of her possessions disappear. With no means of support, Shirley finds herself forced to survive on handouts and by occasional shoplifting at the supermarket. When a young therapist comes into their lives, Shirley grasps the hope that her son may recover his emotional well-being.

Awards
 Durban 2009
 Amiens 2009

External links

 

2009 films
South African drama films
Films directed by Oliver Hermanus